Jane Wacu Wairimu (born 24 March 1985) is a Kenyan volleyball player. She is part of the Kenya women's national volleyball team as a setter. She participated at the 2010 FIVB Volleyball Women's World Championship, and at the 2015 FIVB Volleyball Women's World Cup.
She currently plays with VBC Chamalières.

Mercy Moim was chosen to captain Kenya's team for the postponed 2020 Summer Olympics in Tokyo in 2021.

Clubs
  Kenya Pipeline
  Kenya Prisons 
  VBC Chamalières

References

1985 births
Living people
Kenyan women's volleyball players
Volleyball players at the 2020 Summer Olympics
Olympic volleyball players of Kenya
People from Nyeri County